
Gmina Koszarawa is a rural gmina (administrative district) in Żywiec County, Silesian Voivodeship, in southern Poland, on the Slovak border. Its seat is the village of Koszarawa, part of which forms a separate sołectwo called Koszarawa Bystra.

Neighbouring gminas
Gmina Koszarawa is bordered by the gminas of Jeleśnia, Stryszawa and Zawoja. It also borders Slovakia.

References

Koszarawa
Żywiec County